Spring Valley Creek is a stream in Oregon County in the Ozarks of southern Missouri. It is a tributary of the Eleven Point River.

Spring Valley Creek was so named on account of the many springs which flow into it.

See also
List of rivers of Missouri

References

Rivers of Oregon County, Missouri
Rivers of Missouri